The Paisley Pirates of Penzance is a satirical theatre production originally performed at La Boite Theatre's late night cabaret La Bamba on 8–10 February 1985. The satire coincided with Gilbert and Sullivan's The Pirates of Penzance, the opening production of the Queensland Performing Arts Centre's Lyric Theatre on 7 February 1985. The Paisley Pirates of Penzance was directed by David Pyle and Sean Mee.

History 
The Paisley Pirates of Penzance was the first of six plays produced between 1985 and 1996 by a group of arts workers who formed a company called ToadShow Pty Ltd in 1986. All productions blended two well-known stories and interspersed the story with popular songs while satirising local politics and providing social comment. In The Paisley Pirates of Penzance, the role of the Major-General was played by comedian Gerry Connolly impersonating Queensland Premier Joh Bjelke-Petersen. Connolly became well known for impersonating Bjelke-Petersen and other public figures such as Queen Elizabeth II.

ToadShow produced The Paisley Pirates of Penzance (1985), Conway Christ Redneck Superstar (1985) and Hound of Music (1986), SherWoodstock (1990), Phantoad of the Opera (1991) and Glamalot (1996). Theatre critic John Harris said, "The musicals are unique to Brisbane, conceived and written by a combination of talents undoubtedly unlike any to be found anywhere else in the world. They employ music with a rock beat, satire with a light touch, and casts of dozens, scores, or hundreds, depending upon the venue."

The production of The Paisley Pirates of Penzance was originally intended for two performances only. Demand for tickets saw patrons queueing around the block. A third unscheduled performance in the early hours of 10 February was staged for patrons who had failed to obtain tickets as well as the cast and crew of The Pirates of Penzance who had "got wind" of the production.

Synopsis

ACT 1 
Apprentice pirate Frederic is about to graduate but his heart is not in the job. His guardian Ruth has romantic designs on Frederic but he has never seen another woman. He resolves to venture into the world to seek experience. Frederic meets the Major-General's daughters and he is captivated by the enchanting Mabel. He tells the girls to be wary as there are pirates about. Despite the warning the pirates soon have the girls in their evil clutches and are entertaining matrimonial ambitions. The Major-General arrives to rescue his family.

ACT 2 
Tearing himself away from Mabel, Frederic decides he must stop the pirates with the aid of the police. Just as he is about to set out on the mission, Frederic discovers he is still technically a pirate. Frederic is torn between his love for Mabel and his fealty to the pirates. He rejoins the pirates. The police are still determined to stop the pirates. Mass arrests are avoided when it is revealed that the pirates are actually peers of the realm. Everyone can now live together in peace and harmony.

Music 

 Leader of the Pack
 Oh, is there not one maiden breast?
 Stay, we must not lose our senses
 Get a Job
 I Just Don't Know What to Do with Myself
 Tarantara
 Mrs Brown, You've Got a Lovely Daughter
 You Don't Have To Say You Love Me
 Have I the Right?
 Lazy Sunday Afternoon

Cast 

 Narrator - Leah Cotterell
 Mabel - Justine Anderson
 Frederic - Pat Leo
 Pirate King - Sean Mee
 Major-General - Gerry Connolly
 Constable - Brian Cavanagh
 Ruth - Karen Anderson

Reception 
Writing in Time Off, Gavin Sawford said, "The Paisley Pirates of Penzance [was] a satirical reworking and updating of the Gilbert and Sullivan classic which proved a surprise hit of 1985." Sue Gough in The Australian said Paisley Pirates was hilarious.

References 

Australian musicals